The Good Man Jesus and the Scoundrel Christ is a novel by Philip Pullman.

Published in 2010 by Canongate Books, as part of the Canongate Myth Series, it retells the story of Jesus as if he were two people, brothers, "Jesus" and "Christ," with contrasting personalities; Jesus being a moral and godly man, and his brother Christ a calculating figure who wishes to use Jesus' legacy to found a powerful Church.

Critical reception 
Pullman's historical understanding has been criticised by Jesuit theologian Professor Gerald O'Collins.

While Christopher Hitchens, author of God Is Not Great, praised Pullman's His Dark Materials, he was more critical of The Good Man Jesus and the Scoundrel Christ, accusing Pullman of being a "Protestant atheist" for supporting the teachings of Christ but being critical of organised religion.

Diarmaid MacCulloch reviewed the book positively for Literary Review.

References

External links
The Good Man Jesus and the Scoundrel Christ website
Review of Philip Pullman's Jesus and The Good Man Jesus and the Scoundrel Christ
Sermon given at Westminster Abbey on The Good Man Jesus and the Scoundrel Christ available via Wayback Machine here.

2010 British novels
Novels by Philip Pullman
Novelistic portrayals of Jesus
Books critical of Christianity
Canongate Books books